{{DISPLAYTITLE:C27H34O3}}
The molecular formula C27H34O3 (molar mass: 406.56 g/mol, exact mass: 406.2508 u) may refer to:

 Nandrolone phenylpropionate (NPP), or nandrolone phenpropionate
 Testosterone phenylacetate